Nongthymmai is a census town in East Khasi Hills district in the Indian state of Meghalaya.

Demographics
According to the 2001 India census, Nongthymmai had a population of 34,209. Males constituted 50% of the population and females 50%. Nongthymmai had an average literacy rate of 82%, higher than the national average of 59.5%: male literacy was 84% and female literacy 80%. 11% of the population were under 6 years of age.

Nongthymmai is best known for the presence of the North Eastern Hill University (NEHU) campus. Although NEHU has moved base to Mawlai, a few departments are still located in Nongthymmai.

The name of this small village comes from two words in the Khasi dialect, "nong" meaning "village" and "thymmai" meaning "new", so literally translated it means "the new village".

References

East Khasi Hills district
Cities and towns in East Khasi Hills district